Nudaria diaphanella is a moth of the subfamily Arctiinae first described by George Hampson in 1893. It is found in Sri Lanka.

Description
Its wingspan is 14 mm. The male has a white body with semi-diaphanous wings. Forewings with subbasal and antemedial brown spots on the costa. A postmedial spot runs a waved line to inner margin. There is an indistinct patch found beyond the cell and three large submarginal spots.

References

Nudariina